Mae Sai (Shan:), is the district town of Mae Sai District in the far north of Chiang Rai Province, Thailand. Mae Sai is a major border crossing between Thailand and Myanmar where the town of Tachileik, in Shan State is right across the bridge. Asian Highway Network AH2 (Thailand Route 1 or Phahonyothin Road) crosses the Mae Sai River to the town of Tachileik in Myanmar . The town of Mae Sai and Tachileik are the bi-national conurbation shared between Thailand and Myanmar.

History
The Mae Sai sanitation district was created on 14 May 1956  It was upgraded to a municipality on 25 May 1999. The municipality governs neighborhoods (mu) 1, 2, 3, 10 Wiang Phang Kham subdistrict and Mu 2, 6, 7, 8, 10 Mae Sai Subdistrict

Geography
Neighboring districts are (from the north clockwise): Mae Sai River and Myanmar border; Mae Sai Mittrapab Subdistrict Municipality; Wiang Phang Kham Subdistrict Municipality.

The Tham Luang Nang Non cave is within the subdistrict.

See also 
 Mae Sai District
 Mae Sai River
 Mae Sai Subdistrict

References

External links

Cities and towns in Thailand
Populated places in Chiang Rai province
Myanmar–Thailand border crossings